The H Collective is a United States-based film finance, production, marketing and distribution company founded in 2017. The company has Chinese and American backers. THC is headquartered in Los Angeles, and it has offices in Shanghai and Berlin. THC's "first global title" was the 2019 film Brightburn.

Company history

The H Collective was launched during the 2017 Shanghai International Film Festival with the goal of financing and/or producing four films a year in its first four years. In the following September, the company hired as CEO Nic Crawley, who was the president of international marketing and distribution for Paramount Pictures. The company subsequently hired Jenna Sanz-Agero as EVP Business Affairs and Operations and Ivy Sun as CFO. The company is financially backed by Chinese brothers Kenneth Huang and Kent Huang as well as other Chinese and American backers.

In April 2018, THC partnered with Sony Pictures to market and distribute THC's films. In the same month, Sherryl Clark was hired as THC's President of Production. Sanz-Agero was promoted to Chief Operating Officer, and Sun was promoted to Chief Strategy Officer. Del Mayberry replaced Sun as the CFO. In the following May, THC partnered with the online video platform company iQiyi to co-produce three films.

In May 2019, THC secured investment funding from the Japanese electronic commerce and Internet company Rakuten. By the following August, THC partnered with Rakuten to establish two new entities: the joint venture film production entity Rakuten H Collective Studio and the distribution company Rakuten Distribution.

In 2020, THC opened in Berlin an office that would focus on film development and production, with Mark Rau as Europe CEO. In January 2022, THC signed a co-production deal with Inqisam Studio, a subcompany of Saudi Arabia's Nowaar Entertainment, to produce global films with a focus on the Arabic speaking market.

Project history
The H Collective's first projects in 2017 were distributing and marketing in the Americas the films Hanson and the Beast, Wolf Warrior 2, and A Better Tomorrow 2018. THC also started in June 2017 backing six projects including The Parts You Lose (ultimately released in 2019) and a fourth installment of the  XXX film series (not yet produced). In April 2018, THC acquired the rights to the XXX film series from Revolution Studios. In October 2020, Weying Galaxy filed a lawsuit involving counterparty THC over misrepresentation of acquiring full rights to the XXX film series and alleged "numerous unauthorized transactions" regarding rights to XXX.

In 2018, THC financed and produced the film Brightburn with Troll Court Entertainment, the company of James Gunn, one of the film's producers. With a release in 2019, Deadline Hollywood called Brightburn THC's "first global title".

The first film to be produced under THC's 2019 partnership with Rakuten is Beast, based on a Black List script by Aaron W. Sala, which was acquired in March 2018 by THC in a mid-six figure deal. Morena Baccarin was cast in the starring role, and Espen Sandberg was hired to direct the film. Filming was planned to start in New Zealand in late March 2020, but due to concerns of the COVID-19 pandemic there, production was temporarily halted.

Filmography

Projects in development by The H Collective include The Vineyard, Beast, The Remainders, and Shadow Song.

References

External links

Mass media companies established in 2017
Film production companies of the United States
Companies based in Los Angeles